Wabasha County is a county in the U.S. state of Minnesota. As of the 2020 census, the population was 21,387. Its county seat is Wabasha.

Wabasha County is part of the Rochester Metropolitan Statistical Area.

History
The recently organized Minnesota Territory legislature created Wabasha County on October 27, 1849, one of nine original counties in the territory. An area on the Mississippi River's west bank, originally called Cratte's Landing, had grown into a town named Wabasha, then a city, and when the legislature created the county west of the river around this city, Wabasha was designated the county seat. The city had been named for three successive chiefs of Mississippi bands of Dakota Indians.

Wabasha County's area was reduced in 1853 when sections were partitioned off to create Fillmore, Goodhue, and Rice counties. More area was partitioned off in 1854 to create Winona County, and another part in 1855 to create Olmsted County. The county boundaries have remained the same since 1855.

Geography

Wabasha County lies on Minnesota's border with Wisconsin (across the Mississippi River. The Mississippi flows southeast along the county's eastern line. The North Fork of the Whitewater River flows east through the southern part of the county, then discharges into the Whitewater in Olmsted County. The combined Whitewater then enters the southeastern part of Wabasha County, flowing northeast to its discharge point into the Mississippi. The Zumbro River flows east-northeast through the county to its discharge point into the Mississippi. East Indian Creek and Miller Creek drain the northern part of the county into the Mississippi. The county terrain consists of low rolling hills, considerably rutted by drainages, with all available area devoted to agriculture. The terrain slopes to the east and south, with its highest point on its upper west border at 1,191' (363m) ASL. Wabasha is one of 17 Minnesota counties with more savanna soils than either forest or prairie soils.

Major highways

  U.S. Highway 61
  U.S. Highway 63
  Minnesota State Highway 42
  Minnesota State Highway 60
  Minnesota State Highway 74
  Minnesota State Highway 247

Adjacent counties

 Pepin County, Wisconsin - northeast
 Buffalo County, Wisconsin - east
 Winona County - southeast
 Olmsted County - south
 Goodhue County - west, northwest

Protected areas

 Carley State Park
 Kellogg-Weaver Dunes Scientific and Natural Area
 Mazeppa State Wildlife Management Area
 McCarthy Lake State Wildlife Management Area
 Miller Creek Aquatic Management Area
 Zumbro Falls Woods Scientific and Natural Area

Lakes

 Lake Pepin (part)
 Robinson Lake
 Zumbro Lake (part)
 These lakes are located within the Upper Mississippi River National Wildlife and Fish Refuge
 Cross Lake
 Half Moon Lake
 Maloney Lake
 McCarthy Lake
 Peterson Lake
 Robinson Lake

Demographics

2000 census

As of the 2000 census, there were 21,610 people, 8,277 households, and 5,876 families in the county. The population density was 41.3/sqmi (16.0/km2). There were 9,066 housing units at an average density of 17.3/sqmi (6.69/km2). The racial makeup of the county was 97.97% White, 0.25% Black or African American, 0.27% Native American, 0.43% Asian, 0.62% from other races, and 0.45% from two or more races. 1.68% of the population were Hispanic or Latino of any race. 53.3% were of German, 11.1% Norwegian, 7.3% Irish and 5.0% American ancestry.

There were 8,277 households, out of which 33.80% had children under the age of 18 living with them, 60.80% were married couples living together, 6.50% had a female householder with no husband present, and 29.00% were non-families. 24.30% of all households were made up of individuals, and 10.80% had someone living alone who was 65 years of age or older. The average household size was 2.57 and the average family size was 3.07.

The county population contained 27.10% under the age of 18, 7.20% from 18 to 24, 27.00% from 25 to 44, 23.80% from 45 to 64, and 15.00% who were 65 years of age or older. The median age was 38 years. For every 100 females, there were 100.00 males. For every 100 females age 18 and over, there were 97.90 males.

The median income for a household in the county was $42,117, and the median income for a family was $50,480. Males had a median income of $33,053 versus $24,316 for females. The per capita income for the county was $19,664. About 4.10% of families and 6.00% of the population were below the poverty line, including 6.00% of those under age 18 and 9.30% of those age 65 or over.

2020 Census

Communities

Cities

 Bellechester (partly in Goodhue County)
 Elgin
 Hammond
 Kellogg
 Lake City (partly in Goodhue County)
 Mazeppa
 Millville
 Minneiska (partly in Winona County)
 Plainview
 Wabasha (county seat)
 Zumbro Falls

Unincorporated communities

 Bear Valley
 Camp Lacupolis
 Conception
 Dumfries
 Jarrett
 Maple Springs
 Oak Center
 Reads Landing
 South Troy
 Theilman
 Weaver
 West Albany
 West Newton

Townships

 Chester
 Elgin
 Gillford
 Glasgow
 Greenfield
 Highland
 Hyde Park
 Lake
 Mazeppa
 Minneiska
 Mount Pleasant
 Oakwood
 Pepin
 Plainview
 Watopa
 West Albany
 Zumbro

Politics
Wabasha County voters have traditionally voted Republican. In only two national elections since 1964 has the county selected the Democratic Party candidate (as of 2020).

See also
 National Register of Historic Places listings in Wabasha County, Minnesota
 Upper Mississippi River National Wildlife and Fish Refuge
 Wabasha Public Library

References

External links
 Wabasha-Kellogg (Minnesota) Convention and Visitors Bureau
 Wabasha County government's website
 Wabasha County Health and Demographic Data

 
Rochester metropolitan area, Minnesota
Minnesota counties on the Mississippi River
Minnesota placenames of Native American origin
Dakota toponyms
1849 establishments in Minnesota Territory
Populated places established in 1849